Antef Tsoungui (born 30 December 2002) is a Belgian professional footballer who plays as a centre-back for Lommel, on loan from Brighton & Hove Albion.

Early life
Tsoungui was born in Belgium to a Cameroonian father and Italian mother. Aged 5, he migrated to Crawley with his parents.

Club career
An academy player at Chelsea through to under-14 level, Tsoungui joined the Brighton & Hove Albion Academy in 2018. He made his professional debut for Brighton on 24 August 2021 in a 2–0 EFL Cup victory against Cardiff City.

On the 31 January 2023, Tsoungui joined Challenger Pro League club Lommel on loan for the remainder of the 2022-23 Season.

Career statistics

References

External links
Profile at the Brighton & Hove Albion F.C. website

2002 births
Footballers from Brussels
Sportspeople from Crawley
Footballers from West Sussex
Belgian people of Cameroonian descent
Belgian people of Italian descent
Black Belgian sportspeople
Living people
Belgian footballers
Belgium youth international footballers
Association football defenders
Brighton & Hove Albion F.C. players
Lommel S.K. players
Challenger Pro League players
Belgian expatriate footballers
Expatriate footballers in England
Belgian expatriate sportspeople in England